Ryes is a commune in the Calvados department in the Normandy region in northwestern France.

Population

Administration
Ryes was the seat of the former canton of Ryes, which included 25 communes. Since 2015, it is part of the canton of Bayeux.

Toponymy

In 1060, Ryes was mentioned under the name Rigia.

The ancient forms of its name are apparently related to the French word "raie" (Old French "roie"), deriving from the Gallo-Roman "rica", from the Gallic word "Rica" meaning a "furrow": cf. Middle Gallic "Rych", meaning a "groove", and Old Breton "rec" (modern Breton "rec'h"), meaning a "tear". The word occurred throughout the Gallo-Roman region and is attested in Low Latin in the forms "riga", "rega" and "rige" (FEW volume 10, pp. 393–394).

History

Lord Hubert of Ryes welcomed Duke William during his struggle with his rebellious barons. He then saved William by sending him to Falaise escorted by his three sons while Hubert sent the rebellious barons in another direction.

On 1 July 1899, a 60 cm gauge shortline railroad between Courseulles and Bayeux was opened by Railways Calvados. The same day, a branch starting from Ryes to Arromanches also entered service. The main line and the branch were decommissioned from the network on 29 September 1932.

See also
Communes of the Calvados department

References

Communes of Calvados (department)
Calvados communes articles needing translation from French Wikipedia